Archaeopriapulida is a group of priapulid-like worms known from  Cambrian lagerstätte.  The group is closely related to, and very similar to, the modern Priapulids. It is unclear whether it is mono- or polyphyletic.  Despite a remarkable morphological similarity to their modern cousins, they fall outside of the priapulid crown group, which is not unambiguously represented in the fossil record until the Carboniferous.  They are probably closely related or paraphyletic to the palaeoscolecids; the relationship between these basal worms is somewhat unresolved.

Species
 Genus Acosmia maotiania Chen & Zhoi 1997 (Chengjiang deposits)
 Acosmia maotiania Chen & Zhoi 1997
 Genus Archotuba Hou et al. 1999 (possibly a Cnidarian) (Chengjiang deposits)
 Archotuba conoidalis Hou et al. 1999
 Genus Baltiscalida Slater et al. 2017
 Baltiscalida njorda Slater et al. 2017
 Genus Eopriapulites Liu & al 2014
 Eopriapulites sphinx Liu & al 2014
 Genus Eximipriapulus Ma et al. 2014 (Chengjiang deposits) 
 Eximipriapulus globocaudatus Ma et al. 2014

 Genus Lagenula Luo & Hu 1999 nomen dubium (Chengjiang deposits)
 Lagenula striolata Luo & Hu 1999 nomen dubium
 Genus Laojieella Han et al. 2006 (Chengjiang deposits)
 Laojieella thecata Han et al. 2006
 Genus Lecythioscopa Conway Morris 1977 (Burgess Shale)
 Lecythioscopa simplex (Walcott 1931) Conway Morris 1977  [Canadia simplex Walcott 1931]
 Genus Oligonodus Luo & Hu 1999 nomen dubium (Chengjiang deposits)
 Oligonodus specialis Luo & Hu 1999 nomen dubium 
 Genus Omnidens? Hou & al 2006 (Chengjiang deposits)
 Omnidens amplus Hou & al 2006
 Genus Sandaokania Luo & Hu 1999 nomen dubium (Chengjiang deposits)
 Sandaokania latinodosa Luo & Hu 1999 nomen dubium
 Genus Singuuriqia Peel 2017 (Sirius Passet)
 Singuuriqia simoni Peel 2017
 Genus Sullulika Peel & Willman, 2018
 Sullulika broenlundi Peel & Willman, 2018
 Genus Xishania Hong 1981
 Xishania fusiformis Hong 1981
 Xishania jiangxiensis Hong 1988
 Genus Paratubiluchus Han, Shu, Zhang et Liu, 2004 (Chengjiang deposits)
 Paratubiluchus bicaudatus Han, Shu, Zhang et Liu, 2004
 Genus Xiaoheiqingella Hu 2002
 Xiaoheiqingella peculiaris Hu 2002 [Yunnanpriapulus halteroformis Huang et al 2004] (Chengjiang deposits)
 Genus Priapulites Schram 1973 (Mazon Creek)
 Priapulites konecniorum Schram 1973
 Family Palaeopriapulitidae Hou et al. 1999
 Genus Sicyophorus Luo & Hu 1999 (Chengjiang deposits)
 Sicyophorus rara Luo & Hu 1999
 Sicyophorus sp.
 Genus Paraselkirkia Luo & Hu 1999
 Paraselkirkia sinica (Luo & Hu 1999) Luo & Hu 1999
 Family Selkirkiidae Conway Morris 1977 (stem Palaeoscolecida)
 Genus Selkirkia Walcott 1911
 Selkirkia elongata Luo & Hu 1999 (Chengjiang deposits)
 Selkirkia columbia Walcott 1911 (Burgess Shale)
 Selkirkia pennsylvanica Resser & Howell 1938
 Selkirkia spencei Resser 1939
 Selkirkia willoughbyi Conway Morris & Robison 1986
 Order Ancalagonida Adrianov & Malakhov 1995 (stem Scalidophora)
 Family Ancalagonidae Conway Morris 1977
 Genus Ancalagon (Walcott 1911) Conway Morris 1977 (Burgess Shale)
 Ancalagon minor (Walcott 1911) Conway Morris 1977
 Family Fieldiidae Conway Morris 1977
 Genus Fieldia Walcott 1912 (Burgess Shale)
 Fieldia lanceolata Walcott 1912
 Genus Scolecofurca Conway Morris 1977 (Burgess Shale)
 Scolecofurca rara Conway Morris 1977
 Family Ottoiidae Walcott 1911
 Genus Ottoia Walcott 1911
 Ottoia cylindrica (Sun & Hou 1987)
 Ottoia guizhouenis Yang, Zhao & Zhang 2016 
 Ottoia prolifica Walcott 1911 (Burgess Shale)
 Ottoia tenuis Walcott 1911
 Ottoia tricuspida Smith, Harvey & Butterfield 2015
 Family Corynetidae Huang, Vannier & Chen 2004
 Genus Corynetis Luo & Hu 1999
 Corynetis brevis Luo & Hu 1999 [Anningvermis multispinosus Huang et al 2004) (Chengjiang deposits)
 Corynetis fortis Hu et al. 2012  (Chengjiang deposits)
 Corynetis pusillus (Klug 1842)
 Family Miskoiidae Walcott 1911
 Genus Louisella Conway Morris 1977 (Burgess Shale)
 Louisella pedunculata (Walcott 1911) Conway Morris 1977
 Genus Miskoia Walcott 1911
 Miskoia placida Walcott 1931
 Miskoia preciosa Walcott 1911

References

Priapulida